The 2021 World Aesthetic Group Gymnastics Championships, the 21st edition of the Aesthetic group gymnastics competition, was held in Helsinki, Finland from November 19 to 21, at the Helsinki Ice Hall.

Participating nations

Medal winners

Medal table

References

External links
Official page
IFAGG Event site 

World Aesthetic Gymnastics Championships
2021 in Finnish sport
2021 in gymnastics
Gymnastics competitions in Finland
International sports competitions hosted by Finland
World Aesthetic Gymnastics Championships